Sketches on Standards (subtitled Request selections from the Kenton Dance Library) is an album by pianist and bandleader Stan Kenton featuring performances of jazz standards recorded in 1953 and originally released on the Capitol label as a 10-inch LP.

Critical reception

The Allmusic review by Scott Yanow noted "although these concise interpretations are not essential, the music is quite pleasing". On All About Jazz Jack Bowers said "One can’t help noticing that, unlike many of today’s inseparable clones, Kenton’s soloists — most of them, anyway — are almost instantly identifiable. No one, for example, would mistake Konitz, Candoli, Rosolino or Kamuca for anyone else, and their resourceful improvisations sound as fresh today as they did half a century ago".

Track listing
 "Sophisticated Lady" (Duke Ellington, Irving Mills, Mitchell Parish) - 3:19
 "Begin the Beguine" (Cole Porter) - 3:04
 "Lover Man (Oh, Where Can You Be?)" (Jimmy Davis, James Sherman, Ram Ramirez) - 2:50
 "Pennies from Heaven" (Arthur Johnston, Johnny Burke) - 3:00
 "Over the Rainbow" (Harold Arlen, Yip Harburg) - 3:05
 "Fascinating Rhythm" (George Gershwin, Ira Gershwin) - 2:46
 "There's a Small Hotel" (Richard Rodgers, Lorenz Hart) - 2:43
 "Shadow Waltz" (Al Dubin, Harry Warren) - 2:37
 "Harlem Nocturne" (Earle Hagen) - 3:06 *bonus track on CD
 "Stella By Starlight" (Victor Young - Ned Washington) - 3:18 *bonus track on CD
 "Dark Eyes" (Traditional) - (2:12) - *bonus track on CD
 "Malaguena" (Ernesto Lecuona) -(2:31) - *bonus track on CD
 "Spring is Here" (Rodgers and Hart) (3:19) -  *bonus track on CD
 "I'm Glad There Is You (F. Madeira J. Dorsey) (4:14) - *bonus track on CD

Personnel
Stan Kenton - piano, conductor
Conte Candoli, Buddy Childers, Don Dennis, Maynard Ferguson, Ruben McFall - trumpet
Bob Burgess, Keith Moon, Frank Rosolino, Bill Russo - trombone 
George Roberts - bass trombone
Vinnie Dean, Lee Konitz - alto saxophone
Bill Holman, Richie Kamuca - tenor saxophone
Bob Gioga - baritone saxophone
Sal Salvador  - guitar
Don Bagley - bass
Stan Levey - drums
Stan Kenton (track 2), Lennie Niehaus (track 4), Bill Russo (tracks 1, 3 & 5-8) - arranger

References

Stan Kenton albums
1953 albums
Capitol Records albums
Albums arranged by Bill Russo
Albums conducted by Stan Kenton
Albums produced by Lee Gillette